Kolab Dam is a gravity dam situated near Jeypore town in Koraput district of Odisha, India. The dam impounds Kolab river which is a tributary of Godavari river.

Characteristics 
The majestic Kolab Reservoir generating Hydro Electric Power sitting at an altitude of about 914.4 m (3,000 ft) above sea level on river Kolab,a tributary of Godvari river.

History 
A possible idea of "A project of Kolab dam" were first come during the British Rule when Koraput district was a part of Madras presidency. After Independence, an investigation was taken place by Govt. of Odisha in 1961. Finally the project was approved by the planning commission after several proposals of Govt. of Odisha in 1976 and the project was completed in 1993.

Upper Kolab Hydro Electric Project 

This Project is utilising the water potential of river Kolab, a tributary of river Godavari. The Project has got a Potential of producing 95 MW of firm power with a generation of 832.2 million units and power is distributed to the general grid at the jeypore sub-station.

Tourism 
Kolab Dam is identified as the most Beautiful natural scenic attraction in Odisha. A Botanical garden named Kolab Park built near the dam has around 200 varieties of Flowering plants. Kolab Power Plant located at an altitude of about 914.4 m (3,000 ft) above sea level, is making this place even more beautiful. Thousands of Tourists are attracted to this place to spend the weekend picnic and boating every year.

Panoramic views

References

External links
 Upper Kolab Dam - Water Resources Information System of India

Koraput district
Hydroelectric power stations in India
Dams completed in 1993
Dams in Odisha
1993 establishments in Orissa
20th-century architecture in India